Black Bomb A is a  French old school hardcore / crossover band founded in 1995.

History 
In 2003 the band consisted of two singers, Arno and Poun, the guitarists Scalp and Snake, as well as the bassist Mario and the drummer Hervé.

In 2001, they entered the spotlight for the first time with their own release EP Straight in the Vein. Within two years, Blackbomb A developed into a well-known underground band, with about 300 appearances in France.

Their third album Speech of Freedom held a spot on the French Billboard charts for seven weeks, and was noted for its "angry experimentation-joy", unique in metalcore.

The live album Illicite Stuff Live from 2005 contains recordings from concerts in Saint Nazaire. The album was released in September 2005 amidst the planning of a live tour. After a motorcycle accident involving the bassist Étienne, the band had to cancel the tour. At the beginning of 2006 they began recording a studio album but production was eventually placed on hold, as collaboration with the producer proved difficult. As a result, Black Bomb A separated from their label.

Through collaboration with Sphere they acquired new management at the Warner-Music offshoot Mon Slip. In March 2007, Blackbomb A released their album One Sound Bite to React. The band had evolved both vocally and musically. The album includes a cover version "Beds are Burning" by Midnight Oil, but they remained true to their metalcore roots.

In 2016 they released their new live album 21 Years of Pure Madness / Live Act and played at Edinburgh Metal Party 2016.

Line-up  
Poun - vocals (1995-)
Snake - guitar (1996-)
Hervé Coquerel - drums (2001-)
Arno -  vocals (2002-2007, 2014-)
Pierre Jacou - bass (2011-)

Past members 
Max (IV) - guitar (1995-1996)
Panks - bass (1995-1999)
Franck - drums (1995-2001)
Djag - vocals (1995-2002, 2007-2011)
Mario - bass (1999-2004)
Scalp - guitar (1999-2008)
Etienne - bass (2004-2011)
Shaun Davidson - vocals (2011-2014)

Discography 
 1999: Straight in the Vein
 2001: Human Bomb
 2004: Speech of Freedom
 2005: Illicite Stuf Live
 2006: One Sound Bite to React
 2009: From Chaos
 2012: Enemies of the State
 2015: Comfortable Hate
 2016: 21 Years of Pure Madness / Live Act
 2018: Black Bomb A

References

External links 

 Official Website
 Black Bomb A on Facebook
 Black Bomb A on MySpace

French metalcore musical groups